Copelatus usagarensis is a species of diving beetle. It is part of the subfamily Copelatinae in the family Dytiscidae. It was described by Zimmermann in 1926.

References

usagarensis
Beetles described in 1926